Franz Büchner was a German First World War fighter ace credited with 40 confirmed aerial victories. After scoring his initial aerial victory while flying with Jagdstaffel 9 of the Luftstreitkräfte, he transferred to Jagdstaffel 13 to score the remainder of his victories.

The victory list

This list is complete for entries, though obviously not for all details. Double break in list marks transition between jagdstaffeln. Information was abstracted from Above the Lines: The Aces and Fighter Units of the German Air Service, Naval Air Service and Flanders Marine Corps, 1914–1918, pp. 86–87, and from The Aerodrome webpage on Franz Büchner . Abbreviations from those sources were expanded by editor creating this list.

Aerial victories of Büchner, Franz
Büchner, Franz